Jeffrey Wright (born 1965) is an American actor.

Jeff or Jeffrey Wright may also refer to:

 Jeff Wright (defensive back) (born 1949), American football player for Minnesota
 Jeff Wright (defensive tackle) (born 1963), American football player for Buffalo
 Jeff Wright (footballer) (born 1952), English football midfielder who played for Wigan Athletic
 Jeff Wright (murder victim) (died 2003)
 Jeffrey Cyphers Wright (born 1951), poet
 Jeff Wright, founder of Four Loko

See also
Geoffrey Wright (born 1959), Australian film director
Geoff Wright (born 1930), English footballer
Wright (surname)